Charles Rogers (15 January 1887 – 20 December 1956) was an English film actor, director and screenwriter, best known for his association with Laurel and Hardy. He was born in Birmingham, Warwickshire, England.

In 1928, he joined the Laurel and Hardy crew on the Hal Roach lot, where he worked as actor, writer, and ultimately director. Although he was known informally as "Charley," he was always billed on screen under his given name, Charles Rogers. In the 1940s, as an actor, Rogers was teamed briefly with Harry Langdon in feature films, and with Andy Clyde for a few short comedies.

In 1956, Rogers died in Los Angeles, California, following injuries sustained in an automobile accident.

Partial filmography

Oliver Twist (1912) - Artful Dodger
A Ticket to Red Horse Gulch (1914, Short)
The Woman God Forgot (1917) - Cacamo
The Light of Western Stars (1918) - Danny Marns
Two Tars (1928, Short) - Motorist with Bent Fenders
Habeas Corpus (1928, Short) - Ledoux - the Butler
Double Whoopee (1929, Short) - Prime Minister (uncredited)
Perfect Day (1929, Short) - The Parson (uncredited)
Outside the Law (1930) - Cigar Clerk (uncredited)
Our Wife (1931, Short) - Finlayson's Butler (uncredited)
Pardon Us (1931) - Insurgent Convict (uncredited)
Pack Up Your Troubles (1932) - Rogers (uncredited)
Fra Diavolo (1933)
The Live Ghost (1934, Short)
Going Bye-Bye! (1934, Short)
Them Thar Hills (1934, Short)
Babes in Toyland (1934) - Simple Simon (uncredited)
Bonnie Scotland (1935)
Tit for Tat (1935, Short)
The Bohemian Girl (1936)
Our Relations (1936)
Way Out West (1937)
Block-Heads (1938)
The Flying Deuces (1939)
A Chump at Oxford (1940)
Saps at Sea (1940)
Double Trouble (1941) - Alfred 'Alf' Prattle
House of Errors (1942) - Alf
They Raid by Night (1942) - Sgt. Harry Hall
That Nazty Nuisance (1943) - Josef Goebbels (uncredited)
The Dancing Masters (1943) - Butler (uncredited)
Air Raid Wardens (1943)
God's Country (1946) - Lumberjack (uncredited)
Limelight (1952) - Man in Saloon (uncredited)

References

External links

 
 

1887 births
1956 deaths
Road incident deaths in California
English male film actors
English male silent film actors
English film directors
English male screenwriters
20th-century English male actors
British expatriate male actors in the United States
20th-century English screenwriters
20th-century English male writers